Ruslan Vasilyevich Skvortsov (born 31 January 1980) is a Russian principal dancer of the Bolshoi Ballet.

Biography
Ruslan Skvortsov was born in Yelets, Lipetsk Oblast, where he received his early training from Elena Timofeyeva, and then studied at the Moscow Choreographic Academy with Vyacheslav Mikhaylov. Upon his graduation in 1998 he joined the Bolshoi Ballet, where he has worked under the tutelage of Valery Lagunov and Nikolai Fadeyechev. In 2001 he was awarded a bronze medal at the Moscow International Ballet Competition. He was appointed to the rank of principal dancer in October 2009 and was awarded the title of Meritorious Artist of Russia in April 2014.

Skvortsov made his debut as the soloist of the Fourth Movement of George Balanchine's Symphony in C in 1999 and danced his first leading role in an evening-length ballet, Little Count Cherry in Cipollino, in 2000, followed by the Poet in Michel Fokine's Chopiniana in 2001. He first danced Prince Siegfried in Swan Lake in 2002, followed by debuts as Count Albrecht in Giselle, Lord Wilson/Ta-Hor in The Pharaoh's Daughter, Claude Frollo in Roland Petit's Notre-Dame de Paris and the Ballet Dancer in Alexei Ratmansky's The Bright Stream in 2003. In 2004 Skvortsov first danced Jean de Brienne in Raymonda and Balanchine's Agon, and in 2005 he performed the Miller in Léonide Massine's The Three-Cornered Hat, the Hero in Massine's Les Présages and Demetrius in John Neumeier's A Midsummer Night's Dream. Further debuts followed as Boris in Yuri Grigorovich's The Golden Age (2006), Don José in Carmen Suite (2007), James in La Sylphide (2008), Prince Désiré in The Sleeping Beauty (2008), Conrad in Le Corsaire (2009), Romeo in Grigorovich's production of Romeo and Juliet (2010), the title role in John Cranko's Onegin (2013) and Des Grieux in Neumeier's The Lady of the Camellias (2014). At the Bolshoi Ballet he was the first to perform the roles of Antoine Mistral in Ratmansky's Flames of Paris (2008), Lucien d'Hervilly in Yuri Burlaka's staging of the grand pas from Paquita (2008), Frantz in Sergei Vikharev's reconstruction of Coppélia (2009), Phoebus in Esmeralda (2009), staged by Burlaka and Vasily Medvedev, and My Father, My Hero in Maurice Béjart's Gaîté Parisienne (2019). In 2015 he danced the part of Pechorin ("Princess Mary" section) in the world premiere of Yuri Possokhov's A Hero of Our Time. In 2019 he made his debut as Crassus in Grigorovich's Spartacus.

With the Bolshoi Ballet Skvortsov has performed in the United States, Canada, Mexico, Cuba, the United Kingdom, France, the Netherlands, Belgium, Switzerland, Italy, Norway, Japan, South Korea, China, Singapore, the United Arab Emirates, Turkey, South Africa and Australia. His guest appearances have included performing Swan Lake at the Mariinsky Theatre in Saint Petersburg, Giselle at the Teatro di San Carlo in Naples and Asuka at the New National Theatre Tokyo to mark the 60th anniversary of the Asami Maki Ballet.

Repertoire
La Sylphide (choreography: Johan Kobborg, after August Bournonville): James
Giselle (choreography: Yuri Grigorovich, after Jean Coralli and Jules Perrot): Count Albrecht
Giselle (choreography: Vladimir Vasiliev, after Jean Coralli and Jules Perrot): Count Albrecht
Giselle (choreography: Ludmila Semenyaka, after Jean Coralli and Julies Perrot): Count Albrecht
Coppélia (choreography: Sergei Vikharev, after Marius Petipa and Enrico Cecchetti): Frantz (first interpreter at the Bolshoi)
Swan Lake (choreography: Yuri Grigorovich, after Marius Petipa and Lev Ivanov): Prince Siegfried
Swan Lake (choreography: Konstantin Sergeyev, after Marius Petipa and Lev Ivanov): Prince Siegfried
Swan Lake (choreography: Kyozo Mitani and Terry Westmoreland, after Marius Petipa and Lev Ivanov): Prince Siegfried
Swan Lake (choreography: Alexei Fadeyechev, after Marius Petipa and Lev Ivanov): Prince Siegfried
The Sleeping Beauty (choreography: Yuri Grigorovich, after Marius Petipa): Prince Désiré
Raymonda (choreography: Yuri Grigorovich, after Marius Petipa): Jean de Brienne
La Bayadère (choreography: Yuri Grigorovich, after Marius Petipa): Solor
Don Quixote (choreography: Alexei Fadeyechev, after Marius Petipa and Alexander Gorsky): Espada
Le Corsaire (choreography: Yuri Burlaka and Alexei Ratmansky, after Marius Petipa): Conrad, grand pas des eventails
Esmeralda (choreography: Yuri Burlaka and Vasily Medvedev, after Marius Petipa): Phoebus (first interpreter at the Bolshoi)
Paquita, grand pas (choreography: Yuri Burlaka, after Marius Petipa): Lucien d’Hervilly (first interpreter at the Bolshoi)
The Pharaoh's Daughter (choreography: Pierre Lacotte): Lord Wilson/Ta-Hor
The Nutcracker (choreography: Vasily Vainonen): Nutcracker Prince
The Nutcracker (choreography: Yuri Grigorovich): Nutcracker Prince, Drosselmeyer
Spartacus (choreography: Yuri Grigorovich): Crassus
Romeo and Juliet (choreography: Yuri Grigorovich): Romeo
The Golden Age (choreography: Yuri Grigorovich): Boris
Notre-Dame de Paris (choreography: Roland Petit): Claude Frollo
Onegin (choreography: John Cranko): Onegin
A Midsummer Night’s Dream (choreography: John Neumeier): Demetrius
The Lady of the Camellias (choreography: John Neumeier): Des Grieux
The Bright Stream (choreography: Alexei Ratmansky): Ballet Dancer
Flames of Paris (choreography: Alexei Ratmansky, after Vasily Vainonen): Antoine Mistral (first interpreter), Marquis de Beauregard, Louis XVI
A Hero of Our Time (choreography: Yuri Possokhov): Pechorin, in "Princess Mary" (first interpreter)
The Seagull (choreography: Yuri Possokhov): Sorin (first interpreter)
Asuka (choreography: Asami Maki): Iwatari
Chopiniana (choreography: Michel Fokine): Poet 
Afternoon of a Faun (choreography: Vaslav Nijinsky): Faun
The Three-Cornered Hat (choreography: Léonide Massine): Miller
Les Présages (choreography: Léonide Massine): The Hero
Carmen Suite (choreography: Alberto Alonso): Don José
Gaîté Parisienne (choreography: Maurice Béjart): My Father, My Hero (first interpreter at the Bolshoi)
Symphony in C (choreography: George Balanchine): Second Movement soloist, Third Movement soloist, Fourth Movement soloist
Agon (choreography: George Balanchine): pas de deux
Jewels (choreography: George Balanchine): "Emeralds"
Passacaille (choreography: Roland Petit; Bolshoi premiere)
Magrittomania (choreography: Yuri Possokhov)
Misericordes (choreography: Christopher Wheeldon; world premiere)
Dream of Dream (choreography: Jorma Elo; world premiere)

Filmography
Strictly Bolshoi, Bolshoi Ballet, 2007 (documentary includes a complete performance of Christopher Wheeldon's Misericordes)
Flames of Paris (choreography: Alexei Ratmansky), Bolshoi Ballet, 2010: as Antoine Mistral, with Natalia Osipova, Ivan Vasiliev, Nina Kaptsova, Denis Savin, Anna Antonicheva and Yuri Klevtsov
Swan Lake (choreography: Yuri Grigorovich), Bolshoi Ballet, 2010: as Prince Siegfried, with Maria Alexandrova and Nikolay Tsiskaridze
Symphony in C (choreography: George Balanchine), Bolshoi Ballet, 2010: as the Fourth Movement soloist, with Myriam Ould-Braham
Esmeralda (choreography: Yuri Burlaka and Vasily Medvedev), Bolshoi Ballet, 2011: as Phoebus, with Maria Alexandrova, Ekaterina Krysanova and Denis Savin
Le Corsaire (choreography: Yuri Burlaka and Alexei Ratmansky), Bolshoi Ballet, 2012: as Conrad, with Svetlana Lunkina and Nina Kaptsova
The Bright Stream (choreography: Alexei Ratmansky), Bolshoi Ballet, 2012: as the Ballet Dancer, with Svetlana Lunkina, Maria Alexandrova and Mikhail Lobukhin
Raymonda (choreography: Yuri Grigorovich), Bolshoi Ballet, 2012: as Jean de Brienne, with Maria Alexandrova and Pavel Dmitrichenko
The Pharaoh's Daughter (choreography: Pierre Lacotte), Bolshoi Ballet, 2012: as Lord Wilson/Taor, with Svetlana Zakharova, Nina Kaptsova and Denis Medvedev
Don Quixote (choreography: Alexei Fadeyechev), Bolshoi Ballet, 2016: as Espada, with Ekaterina Krysanova, Semyon Chudin and Anna Tikhomirova
The Golden Age (choreography: Yuri Grigorovich), Bolshoi Ballet, 2016: as Boris, with Nina Kaptsova, Mikhail Lobukhin and Ekaterina Krysanova
A Hero of Our Time (choreography: Yuri Possokhov), Bolshoi Ballet, 2017: as Pechorin, in "Princess Mary", with Svetlana Zakharova, Kristina Kretova and Denis Savin

References

External links
Skvortsov's page on the website of the Bolshoi Theatre (English)
Skvortsov's page on the website of the Bolshoi Theatre (Russian)
Skvortsov's performances in the digital archive of the Bolshoi Theatre (Russian)

1980 births
Living people
Russian male ballet dancers
Bolshoi Ballet principal dancers
Honored Artists of the Russian Federation
People from Yelets
21st-century Russian ballet dancers